Jaime Lipszyc was born August 22, 1971, in San Jose, Costa Rica. He holds national records in the 400m and 1500m swimming races. He participated in the 1986 Madrid World Championships. He went to school at the University of Tennessee where he was an All American.

References  

1971 births
Living people